English DJ and record producer Sub Focus has released three studio albums and 31 singles.

In March 2005, he had a number-one single on the UK Dance Chart with "X-Ray / Scarecrow". The single reached number 60 on the UK Singles Chart. In June 2008, he hit number one on the UK Dance Chart again with "Timewarp / Join the Dots". In August 2009, he entered the UK top 40 for the first time with "Rock It / Follow the Light", which peaked at number 38. "Rock It / Follow the Light" also got him a third UK Dance Chart number one, as well as reaching the B-list of BBC Radio 1's playlist. On 12 October 2009, he released his debut studio album Sub Focus, the album peaked at number 51 on the UK Albums Chart.

In 2012, he released "Out the Blue" featuring Alice Gold and it peaked at number 23 on the UK Singles Chart. It was followed by "Tidal Wave" featuring Alpines which peaked at number 12 on the UK Singles Chart. On 12 May 2013, "Endorphins" featuring Alex Clare was released, continuing his chart success, peaking at number 10 on the UK Singles Chart. The album's fifth single "Turn It Around" was released on 22 September 2013 and peaked at number 14. His second studio album Torus was released on 30 September 2013. The sixth single from Torus, "Turn Back Time", climbed up the UK Singles Chart to number 85 prior to independent release and rose further after being placed on the B-list of BBC Radio 1's playlist. A week later, it climbed 49 places to number 36, and later reached a peak of number 10.

Studio albums

Singles

Other Charted Songs

Remixes

Guest appearances and collaborations

Production credits

VIP mixes

References

Discographies of British artists